The 1878 Scottish Cup Final was the fifth final of the Scottish Cup and the final of the 1877–78 Scottish Cup, the most prestigious knockout football competition in Scotland. The match was played at Hampden Park in Crosshill (today part of Glasgow) on 30 March 1878 and was watched by a crowd of 5,000 spectators. The final was contested by the defending champions Vale of Leven and 3rd Lanark RV who had never won the cup.

Scotland international forward John McDougall scored the only goal of the game after 65 minutes to give Vale of Leven a 1–0 victory and a second successive cup triumph.

Background
For both defending champions Vale of Leven and 3rd Lanark RV, the 1878 final marked their second appearance in the Scottish Cup final. Vale of Leven had beaten Rangers in the 1877 final while 3rd Lanark RV lost to the defending champions, Queen's Park, in 1876.

The teams' only prior meeting was in the previous season's competition when Vale of Leven recorded a 1–0 third-round win on their way to lifting the trophy for the first time.

Route to the final

Both teams progressed through six previous rounds to reach the final.

Vale of Leven

Vale of Leven were given a walkover in the First Round of the cup, before being handed a second round tie away at Dumbarton. They drew 1–1 at Dumbarton before sealing a 4–1 victory in the replay. Vale progressed through the third round with a 3–0 win over Lennox to secure a fourth round tie against Rangers. The first match ended in a goalless draw, but Rangers were soundly beaten 5–0 in the replay at home. A convincing 10–0 win over Jordanhill followed in the fifth round to set up a quarter-final match against Parkgrove. Vale of Leven won 5–0 and were then given a bye in the semi-final stage.

3rd Lanark RV

3rd Lanark RV's cup campaign began with a 1–0 win away at Clyde to give the team a second round tie against Derby, who they defeated 11–0 at Cathkin Park. The team secured a 1–0 victory at home to Queen's Park in the third round. In the fourth round, 3rd Lanark RV again won at home, this time defeating Govan 7–0. They were then again handed a home tie in the fifth round and were again victorious, beating Beith 4–0. 3rd Lanark RV beat South Western 2–1 in the quarter-final before eventually overcoming Renton after two replays in the semi-final.

Match details

References

External links
London Hearts Scottish Football Reports 30 March 1878
1878 Scottish Cup results RSSSF

Scottish Cup Finals
Scottish Cup Final 1878
Scottish Cup Final 1878
Cup
1870s in Glasgow
March 1878 sports events